Paige Nick is a South African novelist, columnist and advertising copywriter.

Early life 
Paige Rachael Nick grew up in Cape Town, South Africa. She was a Rotary Exchange Student in Dickinson, North Dakota in 1992 where she graduated from Dickinson High School and attended Dickinson State University. In January 1993 she studied copywriting and marketing at AAA School of Advertising. In December 1993, she joined TBWA Hunt Lascaris Cape Town for a student holiday job. She was hired there as a junior copywriter in January 1994.

Career

Books 
Nick's first book, A Million Miles from Normal, published in May 2010 and her second novel, This Way Up, was published in May 2011, both by Penguin Books South Africa.

In 2013 she joined up with Sarah Lotz and Helen Moffett, to co-author a series of Choose Your Own Adventure erotic novels, including, A Girl Walks into a Bar, A Girl Walks into a Wedding and  Girl Walks into a Blind Date, which were sold in 21 countries around the world. They were published by Little, Brown (UK) and Harper Collins USA and Jonathan Ball Publishers in South Africa.

In April 2015 Nick's Pens Behaving Badly was published by Kwela Books South Africa. It is a compilation of her Sunday Times columns and the crazy letters they inspired.

Column 
From October 2011 to February 2015 Nick wrote a weekly column on sex, dating, and romance, and other crazy shenanigans, for the Sunday Times newspaper. In February 2015, her column went from being a weekly column, to a monthly column.

Advertising 
For more than twenty years, Nick has worked in various ad agencies on a number of local and international brands, including BMW, Levi’s Jeans, Nashua, Cosmopolitan Magazine, Allan Gray, kulula, Sanlam and Santam.

Nick has won numerous local and international awards including Loeries, and two Loerie Grand Prix, awards at Cannes, The Art Director’s Club of New York, Clios, and recognition at D&D.

The Good Book Appreciation Society 

In 2013 Nick started The Good Book Appreciation Society on Facebook. Wary of Facebook pages for book lovers that have become a playground for self-promotion, Nick started the "secret" virtual book club as a place for readers (many of them writers too), to post honestly about books, by way of reviews, queries and interviews with authors. As of March 2015 the club had over 3000 members.

Bibliography 
 A Million Miles from Normal (2010)
 This Way Up (2011)
 A Girl Walks into a Bar (2013) By Helena S. Paige
 A Girl Walks into a Wedding (2014) By Helena S. Paige
 A Girl Walks into a Blind Date (2015) By Helena S. Paige
 Pens Behaving Badly (2015)

References 

1974 births
Living people
Writers from Cape Town
South African columnists
South African women columnists
Dickinson State University alumni
South African women novelists
21st-century South African novelists
21st-century South African women writers